César Díaz may refer to:
César Díaz (guitarist) (1951–2002), Puerto Rican guitarist
César Díaz (Chilean footballer) (born 1975), Chilean footballer
César Díaz (footballer, born 2002), Chilean footballer
César Díaz (film director) (born 1978), Guatemalan director
César Díaz (Spanish footballer) (born 1987), Spanish footballer